Schinia arcigera, the arcigera flower moth, is a moth of the family Noctuidae. The species was first described by Achille Guenée in 1852. It is found in North America from Nova Scotia to Florida, west to Arizona and Idaho, north to Saskatchewan.

The wingspan is 22–25 mm. Adults are on wing from July to September in the northeast and from August to October in southern New Jersey.

The larvae feed on Symphyotrichum laeve, Symphyotrichum puniceum, Symphyotrichum ericoides and Psilactis tenuis.

Subspecies
Schinia arcigera arcigera
Schinia arcigera ferricasta Smith, 1906

References

Schinia
Moths of North America

Taxa named by Achille Guenée
Moths described in 1852